Physical Biology is a peer-reviewed scientific journal published by IOP Publishing covering a range of fields that bridge the biological and physical sciences, including biophysics, systems biology, population dynamics, etc.  The editor-in-chief is Greg Huber (Chan-Zuckerberg Biohub, San Francisco).

The journal is indexed in ISI Web of Science/Science Citation Index, PubMed, MEDLINE, Inspec, Scopus, BIOSIS Previews/Biological Abstracts, EMBASE, EMBiology, and Current Awareness in Biological Sciences.

External links
Physical Biology
IOP Publishing

Physics journals
IOP Publishing academic journals
Biology journals
Biophysics journals
Bimonthly journals